The Richard Alston Dance Company was a medium size, British contemporary dance company that was formed in 1994 after the demise of the London Contemporary Dance Theatre, based at The Place in London.

External links
Richard Alston Dance Company
The Place website
LondonDance.com

Dance companies in the United Kingdom